Allokutzneria is a genus from the family Pseudonocardiaceae.

References

Pseudonocardiales
Bacteria genera